This was the first edition of the tournament.

Samuel Groth and Chris Guccione won the title, defeating Austin Krajicek and John-Patrick Smith in the final, 6–4, 5–7, [10–8].

Seeds

Draw

Draw

References
 Main Draw

Santaizi ATP Challenger - Doubles
2014 Doubles